Wayne Maurice Henderson (September 24, 1939 – April 5, 2014) was an American soul jazz and hard bop trombonist and record producer. In 1961, he co-founded the soul jazz/hard bop group The Jazz Crusaders. Henderson left the group (who by then had changed their name to The Crusaders) in 1976 to pursue a career in producing, but revived The Jazz Crusaders in 1995.

In 2007, Henderson took a position with the California College of Music in Pasadena, California.

Henderson had suffered from diabetes and died of heart failure at a Culver City hospital on April 5, 2014 at age 74.

Discography

As leader/co-leader
1968: The Freedom Sounds fest. Wayne Henderson People Get Ready (Atlantic)
1969: The Freedom Sounds fest. Wayne Henderson Soul Sound System (Atlantic)
1977: At Big Daddies (ABC)
1977: Big Daddy's Place (ABC)
1978: Living on a Dream (Polydor)
1978: Step in to Our Life (Polydor)(with Roy Ayers)
1979: Emphasized (Polydor)(with Roy Ayers)
1980: Roy Ayers/Wayne Henderson Prime Time (Polydor) 
1992: "Back To The Groove" (PAR 2013 CD) "Wayne Henderson And The Next Crusade"
1993: Sketches of Life - Wayne Henderson & The Next Crusade

With The Jazz Crusaders
Freedom Sound (Pacific Jazz, 1961)
Lookin' Ahead (Pacific Jazz, 1962)
The Jazz Crusaders at the Lighthouse (Pacific Jazz, 1962)
Tough Talk (Pacific Jazz, 1963)
Heat Wave (Pacific Jazz, 1963)
Jazz Waltz (Pacific Jazz, 1963) with Les McCann
Stretchin' Out (Pacific Jazz, 1964)
The Thing (Pacific Jazz, 1965)
Chile Con Soul (Pacific Jazz, 1965)
Live at the Lighthouse '66 (Pacific Jazz, 1966)
Talk That Talk (Pacific Jazz, 1966)
The Festival Album (Pacific Jazz, 1966)
Uh Huh (Pacific Jazz, 1967)
Lighthouse '68 (Pacific Jazz, 1968)
Powerhouse (Pacific Jazz, 1969)
Lighthouse '69 (Pacific Jazz, 1969)
 Give Peace a Chance (Liberty, 1970)
 Old Socks New Shoes – New Socks Old Shoes (Chisa, 1970)

With The Crusaders
 Pass the Plate (Chisa, 1971)
 Hollywood (MoWest, 1972)
 Crusaders 1 (Blue Thumb, 1972)
 The 2nd Crusade (Blue Thumb, 1973)
 Unsung Heroes (Blue Thumb, 1973)
 Scratch (Blue Thumb, 1974)
 Southern Comfort (Blue Thumb, 1974)
 Chain Reaction (Blue Thumb, 1975)
 Those Southern Knights (Blue Thumb, 1976)

As producer
With Wilton Felder
1969 Bullitt (Pacific Jazz)
With Monk Montgomery
1969: It's Never Too Late 
1971: Bass Odyssey

With Ronnie Laws
1975: Pressure Sensitive (Blue Note)

With Caldera 
1976 Caldera (album) (Capitol)

With Pleasure 
1976 Accept No Substitutes (Fantasy)

With Gábor Szabó
1977: Faces (Mercury)

References

External links

1939 births
2014 deaths
African-American musicians
American jazz trombonists
Male trombonists
Hard bop trombonists
Soul-jazz trombonists
Jazz musicians from California
Musicians from Houston
Polydor Records artists
Jazz musicians from Texas
American male jazz musicians
The Crusaders members
20th-century African-American people
21st-century African-American people